Whisler Island is an uninhabited island within Qikiqtaaluk Region, Nunavut, Canada. An island within an island, it is located in Lake Hazen on Ellesmere Island within Quttinirpaaq National Park. It lies opposite Wagon Hill.

References

Ellesmere Island
Uninhabited islands of Qikiqtaaluk Region